Mark Hollis (born September 10, 1962) is an American sports administrator who served as the athletic director at Michigan State University, succeeding Ron Mason on January 1, 2008. Hollis retired on January 31, 2018.

Career
Hollis graduated from Croswell-Lexington High School in Michigan class of 1980. He earned a BA in communication from Michigan State University in 1985 and an MBA from the University of Colorado in 1992. Hollis was a basketball team manager under former head coach Jud Heathcote throughout his undergraduate education at Michigan State. Between his BA and MBA, Hollis worked for the Western Athletic Conference under Commissioner Joseph Kearney, who had previously been athletic director at Michigan State.

Hollis was named athletic director on January 1, 2008 and had been a part of the Michigan State athletic department from 1995 until his retirement on January 31, 2018 which he announced in the wake of the sexual assault investigations and conviction of Larry Nassar.

Hollis was praised for his marketing abilities, helping to stage unusual athletic contests such as the Cold War, an outdoor ice hockey match-up between rivals Michigan State University and the University of Michigan, as Basketbowl, a 2003 match-up between Michigan State University and the University of Kentucky played at Ford Field, and the 2011 Carrier Classic basketball game aboard the USS Carl Vinson, between Michigan State and North Carolina.
Hollis was responsible for hiring former Eastern Michigan University baseball head coach Jake Boss.

References

Living people
1962 births
Michigan State Spartans athletic directors
Michigan State University alumni
University of Colorado alumni